× Vuylstekeara, abbreviated as Vuyl. in horticultural trade, is an intergeneric hybrid between three orchid genera, Cochlioda, Miltonia and Odontoglossum (Cda × Milt × Odm).

References

About the origin of the Vuylstekeara: PODEVIJN,DIRK (red.). Charles Vuylsteke sr. en jr., fine fleur van de Belgische sierteelt (1867-1937).

Orchid nothogenera
Oncidiinae
Historically recognized angiosperm taxa